Galeolaria hystrix is a serpulid worm of the family Serpulidae, endemic to southern Australia and New Zealand.

References
 Annelida.net
 Miller M & Batt G, Reef and Beach Life of New Zealand, William Collins (New Zealand) Ltd, Auckland, New Zealand 1973

Serpulidae
Worms of New Zealand
Animals described in 1863
Endemic fauna of Oceania